For the history of the Jews in Southern Africa see:

 History of the Jews in Angola
 History of the Jews in Botswana
 History of the Jews in Eswatini (Swaziland)
 History of the Jews in Lesotho
 History of the Jews in Malawi
 History of the Jews in Mozambique
 History of the Jews in Namibia
 History of the Jews in South Africa
 History of the Jews in Zambia
 History of the Jews in Zimbabwe

See also
Many of the following articles relate to Jewish history in Southern Africa:

 History of the Jews in the Democratic Republic of the Congo
 History of the Jews in Madagascar
 History of the Jews in Mauritius
 History of the Jews in Seychelles
 History of the Jews in Tanzania